Please Plant This Book is Richard Brautigan's sixth poetry publication. The collection consists of a folded and glued folder containing eight seed packets. On the front of each seed packet is a poem. It was Brautigan's last self-publishing venture and the edition ran 6,000 copies. The entire edition was offered for free distribution, and permission to reprint the collection was explicitly granted, as long as the new printing was also offered free of charge. Although a relatively large edition for an early Brautigan work, it's one of the harder items to find. 

The eight poem titles and associated seed packets are as follows:
 California Native Flowers
 Calendula
 Carrots
 Lettuce
 Sweet Alyssum Royal Carpet
 Squash
 Shasta Daisy
 Parsley

Dinefwr Literature Festival 
This project was re-created for the Dinefwr Literature Festival in June 2012 in West Wales. Brautigan-inspired events celebrated the start of the festival. In addition to reprinting the poetry folders, the public will be taken on a walk through the grounds where a pomegranate tree, nicknamed "the Brautigan pomegranate", was planted. Ianthe Brautigan, Brautigan's daughter, was present at the festival, having flown in from San Francisco to join in the celebrations.

External links
Entry on brautigan.net
https://www.diggers.org/plant_this_book.htm
https://gardencollage.com/change/environmental-justice/richard-brautigans-please-plant-book-kickstarted-revolution/

References

1968 poetry books
American poetry collections
Works by Richard Brautigan